Albion Place may refer to:

Albion Place, Leeds, a street in the centre of the English city of Leeds
Albion Place, Reading, a residential terrace in the English city of Reading